Richard Olney (January 5, 1871  Milton, Strafford County, New Hampshire – January 15, 1939 Boston, Massachusetts) was a member of the United States House of Representatives from Massachusetts.

Life
He attended the public schools, Leicester Academy and graduated from Brown University in 1892. He became a wool merchant. Olney was elected a member of the Massachusetts House of Representatives in 1902.  He was chairman of the Board of Selectmen of Leicester.

He was an unsuccessful candidate for lieutenant governor in 1903, was member of the Massachusetts Minimum Wage Commission, and was a delegate to the Democratic National Convention in 1912.  Olney was elected as a Democrat to the 64th, 65th and 66th United States Congresses, serving from March 4, 1915, to March 3, 1921.

He was appointed a member of the World War Foreign Debt Commission in 1923 and reappointed by President Calvin Coolidge in 1925. He served as chairman of the Massachusetts Parole Board, and was chairman of the Massachusetts Commission of the Necessaries of Life from 1938 until his death. He was buried at the Cherry Valley Cemetery in Leicester.

Olney was a nephew of U.S. Secretary of State and Attorney General Richard Olney and of New York County D. A. Peter B. Olney.

References
 Eggert, Gerald G. "Richard Olney and the Income Tax Cases." Mississippi Valley Historical Review 48 (June 1961): 24-41
 James, Henry. Richard Olney and his Public Service. Boston: Houghton Mifflin, 1923.

External links
 

1871 births
1939 deaths
Brown University alumni
Democratic Party members of the Massachusetts House of Representatives
People from Leicester, Massachusetts
People from Milton, New Hampshire
Democratic Party members of the United States House of Representatives from Massachusetts
Politicians from Dedham, Massachusetts